Lupinus lepidus, the Pacific lupine, prairie lupine or dwarf lupine is a perennial herbaceous plant in the pea family (Fabaceae) endemic to western North America. Many varieties have been described, several of which are considered separate species by some authorities.

Habitat and range
In western North America,  Lupinus lepidus may be found in open areas from low prairie, open montane forest, to the alpine. Although rare in British Columbia, its range extends south from Alaska to southern California and eastward to the Rocky Mountains.

Description

Lupinus lepidus is a small hairy perennial that reaches . Palmately compound leaves extend up the stem, but most are basal.  The inflorescence is a dense spike-like raceme, with pink, purple, or blue flowers that often have a yellowish spot. The plant blooms from mid-April through August, depending on elevation and habitat.  The fruit is a pod containing multiple seeds.

References

External links

lepidus
Flora of the Sierra Nevada (United States)
Plants described in 1828
Flora of Alaska
Flora of British Columbia
Flora of the Western United States
Flora without expected TNC conservation status